Morenedalen is a valley in Sabine Land at Spitsbergen, Svalbard. The valley separates Myklegardfjellet from Agardhfjellet, and widens to the south to the coastal plain Belemnittsletta.

References

Valleys of Spitsbergen